Vitali Taskinen (born July 27, 1986) is a Finnish former professional ice hockey goaltender.

Taskinen began his career with KalPa's academy where he played from 2001 to 2006, but despite being dressed in three games he was released without ever playing for their senior team. He then moved to the Czech Republic and played three games with HC Slavia Praha of the Czech Extraliga.

Taskinen is currently working as a goaltender coach for Jokerit's U20 academy.

References

External links

1986 births
Living people
Finnish ice hockey goaltenders
HC Kobra Praha players
People from Kuopio
HC Slavia Praha players
Sportspeople from North Savo
Finnish expatriate ice hockey players in the Czech Republic
Finnish ice hockey coaches